Line 1 is a line on the Metrorrey system. It has 19 stations and it runs  from Talleres to Exposición. The line opened on April 25, 1991.

History
Construction for Line 1 began on April 18, 1988 and it opened three years later on April 25, 1991, from Exposición to San Bernabé. On June 11, 2002, a new station on the line was opened: Talleres, replacing San Bernabé station as the northern terminus of the line.

Chronology
April 25, 1991: from Exposición to San Bernabé
June 11, 2002: from San Bernabé to Talleres

Station list

References

 
Underground rapid transit in Mexico
Electric railways in Mexico
Railway lines opened in 1991
1991 establishments in Mexico